Regina Blois Duarte (born 5 February 1947) is a Brazilian actress who briefly served as Special Secretary of Culture, a cabinet position in President Jair Bolsonaro's federal administration, from March to May 2020.

Political activities
Her efforts against former Brazilian president Luiz Inácio Lula da Silva (of the Workers' Party) in the 2002 elections caused considerable controversy. Duarte appeared in a TV advertisement saying that she was afraid of what could happen to Brazil if Lula won:

She was also involved in the short-lived polemic organization Cansei.

Special Secretary of Culture
Following Roberto Alvim's controversy and subsequent removal from office in January 2020, Duarte was invited to be Special Secretary of Culture. At first, she did not accept the job, but on January 29, Duarte announced after a meeting that she had decided to accept the position. On March 4, 2020, she took office as the fourth Special Secretary of Culture in Jair Bolsonaro's government.

Duarte's time as secretary had no shortage of controversies, the most recent of which happened on May 7. During an interview with CNN Brazil, Duarte minimized the negative aspects of the Military dictatorship in Brazil, such as assassination and torture. When questioned by a fellow actress, Maitê Proença, about her plans to help artists during the COVID-19 pandemic, Duarte abruptly ended the interview.

On May 20, 2020, Bolsonaro posted a video to Twitter in which, alongside  Duarte, he announces her transfer from Special Secretary of Culture to president of Cinemateca Brasileira, an institution in São Paulo responsible for the preservation of Brazilian audiovisual production. In the video, Duarte states that, while living in Brasília, she misses her family, and that a transfer to São Paulo would mean she could live with her relatives again. Her successor as Special Secretary of Culture was Mário Frias, who took office on June 23, 2020.

Filmography

Television

Film
1968 - Lance Maior - Cristina
1969 - A Compadecida - Compadecida
1975 - O Auto da Compadecida
1976 - Chão Bruto - Sinhana
1977 - Parada 88, o Limite de Alerta - Ana
1978 - Daniel, Capanga de Deus - Beatriz / Sandra
1981 - The Underground Man - Luisa dos Santos
1982 - O Homem do Pau-Brasil - Lalá
1983 - O Cangaceiro Trapalhão - Aninha
1984 - São Bernardo - Madalena
1985 - Happily Ever After - Fernanda
1995 - La Lona
2000 - Um Anjo Trapalhão
2003 - Olga Del Volga - unfinished to this day
2012 - Astro: An Urban Fable in a Magical Rio De Janeiro
2014 - Gata Velha Ainda Mia

Theater
1966 - A Megera Domada
1967 - Black-Out - uma adolescente
1969 - Romeu e Julieta - Julieta Capuleto
1971 - Dom Quixote, Mula Manca e seu Fiel Companheiro
1975 - Réveillon - Janete
1978 - O Santo Inquérito - Branca Dias
1986 - Miss Banana - musical
1992 - A Vida É Sonho - Segismundo
2001 - Honra - Norah
2005 - Coração Bazar
2013 - Bem-Vindo, Estranho - Jaki

Awards
Awards IstoÉ Gente
2006 - personalidade the year in television(IstoÉ Gente)
Awards Contigo
1997 - the body of work (in performance in Por Amor
Professional Quality Award
2002 - the body of work (in performance in Desejos de Mulher
Globe Award for Best Actress
1971 - by "Patrícia", in Minha Doce Namorada
Press Award for Best Actress
1965 - by "Malu", in A Deusa Vencida (actress revelation)
1967 - by "Bete", in Os Fantoches
1970 - by "Ritinha", in Irmãos Coragem
1972 - by "Simone" e "Rosana", in Selva de pedra
1973 - received the award for best actress in Carinhoso as another actress thought deserved the prize offered for Eva Wilma.
1979 - by "Malu", in Malu Mulher
1985 - by "Viúva Porcina", in Roque Santeiro
APCA Award / TV Actress
1979 - by Malu Mulher
1980 - by Malu Mulher
1985 - by Roque Santeiro

References

External links

|- style="background:#ddd;"
| colspan="5" style="text-align:center;"| APCA Awards

|-
|- style="background:#ddd;"
| colspan="5" style="text-align:center;"| Troféu Imprensa

|-

1947 births
Living people
People from Franca
Brazilian people of Portuguese descent
Brazilian stage actresses
Brazilian telenovela actresses
Brazilian film actresses
20th-century Brazilian actresses
21st-century Brazilian actresses